Seth G. Huntington (February 12, 1930 – November 3, 2021) was an American artist and sculptor. He designed the reverse of the 1975–1976 Bicentennial Kennedy half dollar.

References

External links
Seth G. Huntington

1930 births
Living people
20th-century American sculptors
20th-century American male artists
Place of birth missing (living people)